Sunny Side Up (stylized on-screen as Sunnyside Up) is a 1929 American pre-Code  Fox Movietone musical film starring Janet Gaynor and Charles Farrell, with original songs, story, and dialogue by B. G. DeSylva, Lew Brown and Ray Henderson. The romantic comedy/musical premiered on October 3, 1929, at the Gaiety Theatre in New York City. The film was directed by David Butler, had (now-lost) Multicolor sequences, and a running time of 121 minutes.

Plot

The film centres around a Will-they won't-they romance. Wealthy Jack Cromwell from Long Island runs off to New York City on account of his fiancee's relentless flirting. He attends an Independence Day block party where Molly Carr, from Yorkville, Manhattan, falls in love with him. Comic relief is provided by grocer Eric Swenson, above whose shop Molly and her flatmate, Bea Nichols, live. Gaynor performs a charming singing and dancing version of the song "(Keep Your) Sunny Side Up" for a crowd of her neighbors, complete with top hat and cane.  Later in the film, a lavish pre-Code dance sequence for the song "Turn on the Heat", including scantily clad and gyrating island women enticing bananas on trees to abruptly grow and stiffen, with the graphic metaphor lost on no one, occurs without Gaynor's participation.

Cast
Janet Gaynor as Molly Carr
Charles Farrell as Jack Cromwell
Marjorie White as Bea Nichols
El Brendel as Eric Swenson
Mary Forbes as Mrs. Cromwell
Peter Gawthorne as Lake
Sharon Lynn as Jane Worth

Reception
The Times and The New York Times both express the opinion that the film, and the singing voices of Gaynor and Farrell, are all tolerable if not exactly worthy of praise. Despite the sugary sentimentality, the film is engaging, while the cinematography and special effects are impressive.

Footage from Sunny Side Up was included in the comedy film It Came from Hollywood, which parodied
B movies.

The film is recognized by American Film Institute in these lists:
 2006: AFI's Greatest Movie Musicals – Nominated

Music

"I'm a Dreamer, Aren't We All?"
Several times throughout the film Gaynor sings the tune "I'm a Dreamer, Aren't We All?" and, on one occasion, sings it impressively, according to the New York Times. The credits are: words, De Sylva & Brown; music, Ray Henderson.

The song was punned by the Marx Brothers in the film Animal Crackers (1930). Groucho asks his brother to "play the song about Montreal". Chico asks, "Montreal?, and Groucho replies, "I'm a dreamer, Montreal."  The pun has been much-recycled  not least in Stewart Parker's award-winning play I’m a Dreamer, Montreal.

An early popular recording was by Paul Whiteman and His Orchestra on October 16, 1929 with a vocal group including Bing Crosby  and this reached the charts in 1929. The tune was also recorded by John Coltrane in 1958  and included on his album Bahia (1964).

"Turn on the Heat"
In addition to appearing in the Sunny Side Up, "Turn on the Heat" was recorded as a solo stride piano piece by Fats Waller in 1929, and this recording has been reissued numerous times. The song was also used in the 1933 Pooch the Pup cartoon Hot and Cold.

"(Keep Your) Sunny Side Up"
Another song in the film that would later be used as the theme song to the 1988 British sitcom Clarence.

In the 1950s, the song was used as the theme song for Sunnyside Up, a variety program produced by HSV-7 (a television station in Melbourne, Australia). The song's melody was later adapted by the Essendon Football Club for its club song, "See the Bombers Fly Up", written by Kevin Andrews in 1959.

A 1929 recording of the song by Johnny Hamp's Kentucky Serenaders plays during the closing credits of the 1973 film Paper Moon.

See also
List of early color feature films

References

External links

1929 films
1929 musical comedy films
1929 romantic comedy films
1920s color films
American musical comedy films
American romantic comedy films
American black-and-white films
1920s English-language films
Films directed by David Butler
Films set in New York City
Fox Film films
Independence Day (United States) films
1920s American films
Silent romantic comedy films